Petra Grabowski-Borzym (born 31 January 1952 in Brandenburg an der Havel) is an East German sprint canoer who competed in the early 1970s. She won a silver medal in the K-2 500 m event at the 1972 Summer Olympics in Munich.

Grabowski's husband, Hans-Joachim Borzym, won a bronze medal in the eights rowing event at those same games.

At the ICF Canoe Sprint World Championships, she won six medals with a gold (K-2 500 m: 1973), three silvers (K-1 500 m: 1973, K-2 500 m: 1971, K-4 500 m: 1970), and two bronzes (K-2 500 m: 1970, K-4 500 m: 1971).

References

Sports-reference.com profile

1952 births
Canoeists at the 1972 Summer Olympics
East German female canoeists
Living people
Olympic canoeists of East Germany
Olympic silver medalists for East Germany
Olympic medalists in canoeing
ICF Canoe Sprint World Championships medalists in kayak

Medalists at the 1972 Summer Olympics
Sportspeople from Brandenburg an der Havel